LeFrak City (originally spelled Lefrak and pronounced ) is a 4,605-apartment development in the southernmost region of Corona and the easternmost part of Elmhurst, a neighborhood in the New York City borough of Queens. It is located between Junction Boulevard to the west, 57th Avenue to the north, 99th Street to the east, and the Long Island Expressway to the south.

Description
(Each building's topmost floor is signed as 18, and there are no thirteenth floors.) The buildings are all named after cities or countries around the world and are grouped in clusters of four based on their theme. This naming system came about during the 1964 New York World's Fair, which was located in nearby Flushing Meadows–Corona Park. The development is part of Queens Community Board 4.

The site includes sitting and play areas (including two artificial turf fields), sports courts, a swimming pool, a branch of the Queens Borough Public Library, a post office, two large office buildings, shops, and over 3,500 parking spaces. A $70 million renovation project, which ended in 2017, entailed installing solar panels atop the complex's roofs; updating the facades, boiler rooms, building interiors, swimming pool, and roofs; constructing new play areas; adding wheelchair access; and landscaping the grounds. LeFrak City also contains New York City's first robotic security guard. The Queens Center Mall and Rego Center are both two to three blocks away from the development, as is the Woodhaven Boulevard station on the New York City Subway's .

History
Named for its developer, the LeFrak Organization (founded by Samuel J. LeFrak), LeFrak City was built in 1962–1971 primarily for working- and middle-class families who were interested in modern facilities but could not afford or did not desire to live in Manhattan. The complex was built atop Horse Brook, a small stream that once wound through Elmhurst along the path of the LIE. The land on which LeFrak City is located was previously undeveloped marshland, and the megablocks of LeFrak City are a remnant of the lack of development on the site.

The fortunes of the buildings have been closely tied to housing and social trends in New York in general, and after a period of decline in the 1970s and rapid "white flight", the complex became home to a very diverse population. The development remains popular with 98% occupancy due to its reasonable rents, and large apartments.

Notable residents
Notable current and former residents of LeFrak City include:
 Akinyele (born 1970), rapper.
 Kenny Anderson (born 1970), former basketball player for the New Jersey Nets and other teams during his ten-year NBA career.
 Telfar Clemens (born 1985), Liberian-American fashion designer, DJ and founder of eponymous TELFAR, a genderless fashion label based in Bushwick, Brooklyn.
 Bryant Dunston (born 1986), professional basketball player in Europe and Asia.
 Ehinomen Ehikhamenor (born 1980), professional boxer who fights in the cruiserweight division.
 Ellie Greenwich and Jeff Barry, worked with Phil Spector and composed many of the 'girl group' era's greatest hits, including "Chapel of Love", "Da Doo Ron Ron" and "Leader of the Pack".
 Kaz Hirai (born 1960), Japanese businessman who was the President and CEO of Sony Corporation.
 Simon Nabatov (born 1959), pianist.
 Noreaga (born 1977, aka N.O.R.E.), rapper.
 Nneka Onuorah (born 1988), director and producer best known for her 2015 directorial debut, The Same Difference.
Prodigy (1974-2017), rapper, actor and author.
Kool G Rap (born 1968), rapper.
 Kenny Smith (born 1965), sports commentator and former professional basketball player for various teams during his ten-year NBA career.
 Jermaine Turner (born 1974), American-Irish former professional basketball player who spent most of his 17-year career playing in the Irish Super League.
 Mark White (born 1962), bass player for the Spin Doctors.

See also
 Cooperative Village
 Co-op City, Bronx
 Mitchell Lama
 Marcus Garvey Village
 Parkchester, Bronx
 Parkfairfax, Virginia
 Parkmerced, San Francisco
 Park La Brea, Los Angeles
 Penn South
 Riverton Houses
 Rochdale Village, Queens
 Starrett City, Brooklyn
 Stuyvesant Town–Peter Cooper Village

References

External links
 
"LeFrak City: One of (the) Largest Housing Complexes in Queens" from About.com
A Developer's 30: LeFrak's Queens
LeFrak Organization, developer's website
 Lefrak collection in process. Held by the Department of Drawings & Archives, Avery Architectural & Fine Arts Library, Columbia University.

Neighborhoods in Queens, New York
Housing in New York City
Corona, Queens
Elmhurst, Queens
Multi-building developments in New York City
1962 establishments in New York City